The Minister of Defence is a member of the Finnish Council of State. As the head of the Ministry of Defence, the minister is responsible for the administration of national defence. The ministry is headquartered in Helsinki. The current Minister of Defence is Antti Kaikkonen.

From June to November 1918 the post was called Chief of the War Department, and from then until 1922 the post was called the Minister of War.

The President of the Republic is the commander-in-chief of the Finnish Defence Forces. The commander of the military forces is the Chief of Defence.

Ministry Offices

Finnish Ministry of Defence Offices consists of two wings:

 South Makasiinikatu 8 since - Built by CL Engel as barracks for the Finnish Guard in 1922 and destroyed in 1944 and rebuilt by retaining the original walls from 1954-1956 and used as Defense Headquarters since 1956
 Fabiansgatan 2 - newer wing was built in 1961 by Finnish architects Viljo Revell and Heikki Castrén.

Previous Ministry Offices

 Eteläesplanadi 10 - 1918-1921 it was located here and now home to Ministry of Justice
 Korkeavuorenkatu 21 (Ohrana House) - relocated in 1921 and here until beginning of World War II; now Finnish Border Guard Headquarters
 Snellmaninkatu 4-6 - moved here 1941 to 1956 which now home to Finnish Financial Supervision Authority

List of Ministers of Defence

See also
 Minister of Defence

References

External links 
 The Ministry of Defence of Finland

-
Military of Finland
Defence